Matthieu is a given name or surname. It comes from French Matthieu, which is from Latin Matthaeus, derived from Greek Ματθαῖος (Matthaios) from Hebrew מתתיהו (Matatyahu), מתיתיהו (Matityahu), meaning "gift of the Lord; gift of  Yahweh".
The name may refer to:

First name
Matthieu Aikins (born 1984), Canadian journalist
Matthieu Bataille (born 1978), French judoka
Matthieu Bemba (born 1988), French football player
Matthieu Bochu (born 1979), French football player
Matthieu Bonafous (1793–1852), French botanist 
Matthieu Borsboom (born 1959), Dutch admiral
Matthieu Boujenah (born 1976), French comedian
Matthieu Boulo (born 1989), French cyclist
Matthieu Chalmé (born 1980), French football player 
Matthieu Chedid (born 1971), French singer
Matthieu Cottière (1581–1656), French pastor and writer
Matthieu Dafreville (born 1982), French judoka
Matthieu de La Teulière (died 1702), French painter
Matthieu Delpierre (born 1981), French football player
Matthieu Descoteaux (born 1977), Canadian ice hockey player
Matthieu Dreyer (born 1989), French football player
Matthieu Franke (born 1985), German rugby player
Matthieu Gianni (born 1985), French football player
Matthieu Hartley (born 1960), British musician
Matthieu Jeannes (born 1987), French cyclist
Matthieu Jost (figure skater) (born 1981), French dancer
Matthieu Lahaye (born 1984), French racing car driver
Matthieu Laurette (born 1970), French artist 
Matthieu Lecuyer (born 1980), French racing car driver
Matthieu Lièvremont (born 1975), French rugby player
Matthieu Louis-Jean (born 1976), French football player
Matthieu Madelaine (born 1983), French swimmer
Matthieu Marais (1664–1737), French jurist and writer
Matthieu Mendès (born 1982), French musician
Matthieu Onoseke (born 1988), Congolese football player 
Matthieu Ory (1492–1557), French theologian and inquisitor
Matthieu Péché (born 1987), French canoeist 
Matthieu Petit-Didier (1659–1728), French theologian
Matthieu Pichot (born 1989), French football player
Matthieu Proulx (born 1981), Canadian football player
Matthieu Ricard (born 1946), French Buddhist monk 
Matthieu Rosset (born 1990), French diver
Matthieu Sans (born 1988), French football player
Matthieu Saunier (born 1990), French football player 
Matthieu Sprick (born 1981), French cyclist
Matthieu Suiche (born 1988), French computer scientist and entrepreneur
Matthieu Ugalde (born 1992), French rugby player
Matthieu van Eysden (1896–1970), Dutch actor
Matthieu Vaxivière (born 1994), French racing car driver
Matthieu Verschuere (born 1972), French football player

Surname
Claude Matthieu (1766–1818), French general and diplomat
François X. Matthieu (1818–1914), Canadian pioneer of Oregon
Georg David Matthieu (1737–1778), German engraver and painter 
Jean-Baptiste Charles Matthieu (1763–1833), French politician
Pierre Matthieu (1563–1621), French writer

See also
Matthieu River, Dominica
Mathieu
Matthew (name)

French masculine given names
French-language surnames